Prof. Mark Harman is a British computer scientist. Since 2010, he has been a professor at University College London (UCL) and since 2017 he has been at Facebook London. He was founder of the Centre for Research on Evolution Search and Testing (CREST) initially at King's College London in 2006, latterly at UCL, and was the Director until 2017.  Harman has received both of the major research awards for software engineering (both awarded in 2019): the IEEE Harlan D. Mills Award, for "fundamental contributions throughout software engineering, including seminal contributions in establishing search-based software engineering, reigniting research in slicing and testing, and founding genetic improvement";  and the ACM SIGSOFT Outstanding Research Award

Harman studied software engineering at Imperial College, London between 1984–88. He has previously worked at the Polytechnic of North London (1988–91), University of North London (1991–97), where he was latterly Head of Computing, Goldsmiths College, University of London (1998–2000), Brunel University (2000–04), and King's College London, UK (2004–10) where he led the Software Engineering Group.

In September 2016, Harman co-founded Majicke Limited, creator of the Sapienz bug finding app. The company was acquired by Facebook and in February 2017 Harman joined Facebook London as a full-time Engineering Manager. He remains as a part-time professor of Software Engineering in CREST and the Computer Science department at University College London. He organizes the annual Facebook Testing & Verification (TAV) Symposium.

Mark Harman has published many academic papers, especially in the area of software testing, with an h-index of 75 (in 2017) according to Google Scholar. He has contributed particularly in the areas of program slicing and program transformation.
He is on the editorial boards of a number of academic journals including IEEE Transactions on Software Engineering and Software Testing, Verification & Reliability.

He coined the term search-based software engineering (SBSE) with B. F. Jones in 2001. Search-based automated test design technology has been deployed at Facebook since September 2017. Harman has also been working on "web-enabled simulation", a technology which uses a parallel version of Facebook to enable modelling and experimenting with approaches impeding bad actors.

Books
 Harman, M. and Jones, R., First Course in C++: A Gentle Introduction. McGraw-Hill, 1996. .
 Hierons, R., Bowen, J.P., and Harman, M., editors, Formal Methods and Testing.  Springer-Verlag, LNCS, Volume 4949, 2008. .

References

External links
 Facebook home page
 UCL home page
 

Year of birth missing (living people)
Living people
Alumni of the Department of Computing, Imperial College London
Academics of the University of North London
Academics of Goldsmiths, University of London
Place of birth missing (living people)
Academics of Brunel University London
Academics of King's College London
Academics of University College London
Facebook employees
Formal methods people
Software testing people
Computer science writers
English computer scientists
English book editors